Nadine Avril Moodley (born 9 April 1990) is a South African cricketer who plays as a right-handed batter for KwaZulu-Natal Coastal. She appeared in one Test match, nine One Day Internationals and nine Twenty20 Internationals for South Africa between 2013 and 2015. She has previously played domestic cricket for Western Province.

References

External links
 

1990 births
Living people
Cricketers from Durban
South African women cricketers
South Africa women Test cricketers
South Africa women One Day International cricketers
South Africa women Twenty20 International cricketers
KwaZulu-Natal Coastal women cricketers
Western Province women cricketers
20th-century South African women
21st-century South African women